Noy Lives in Thailand (original title: Noy bor i Thailand) is the title of a book by the Swedish writer Astrid Lindgren, with photos by Anna Riwkin-Brick. In 1966 the book was published by Rabén & Sjögren.

Plot 
Noy lives with her parents in Thailand, in a small village near Bangkok. Noy would like to go to the big city. But her parents believe that she is still too small for it. Noy is more than pleased when her father actually wants to take her to Bangkok one day. Together, they go there by raft. Since Noy's father has to do some shopping, he tells Noy to wait for him on the raft. But Noy thinks the city is too exciting to wait there and leaves the raft. When Noy gets hungry, she wants to return to her father's raft. But she does not find the way back. After a long time she comes to a temple. She prays that she finds her father again, but at the same time she is so exhausted that she falls asleep on the spot. When she wakes up and leaves the temple, she sees her father standing there. He had already been worried about her. He takes Noy home. Along the way, Noy explains that Bangkok is good in two ways, it's good to get there, but just as good to leave again.

Overview 
Noy Lives in Thailand is the eleventh of a total of 15 books from the series Children's Everywhere. The story is based on true events. However, some things have changed. In Sweden, the book was first published in 1966 by Rabén & Sjögren.

In addition, the book has been translated into many different languages, including English, German and Hebrew. While the girl's name in German is Wanthai, she is called Noy in the original and the English translation. In Israel, the series Children's Everywhere, which also includes Noy Lives in Thailand, has been a great success. The latter was also based on the translations of the poet Leah Goldberg. In 2015 a new edition of the book had been published in Israel.

Reception 
Readingastrid believes that Noy Lives in Thailand is one of the best children's stories of Children's Everywhere. It is a simple, but also interesting and sweet story. Noy as a character is fun. In addition, the story is also appealing to children today!

Sipurpashut.com describes the book as a classic for several generations. In this book, the children get to know the everyday life of a girl in Thailand, learning about Noy, her family, her home and Bangkok.

Editions 
 Noy bor i Thailand, Rabén & Sjögren, 1966, Swedish Edition
 Noy Lives in Thailand, Circus Child, Methuen, 1967, British Edition
 Noy Lives in Thailand, Circus Child, The Macmillan Company, 1967, US-american Edition
 Wanthai aus Thailand, Oetinger Verlag, 1967, German Edition
 Noy bor i Thailand, Høst & søn, 1967, Danish Edition
 Noy bor i Thailand, Gyldendal, 1967, Norwegian Edition

References 

Works by Astrid Lindgren
1966 children's books
Methuen Publishing books
Rabén & Sjögren books
Novels set in Thailand